The libertine novel was an 18th-century literary genre of which the roots lay in the European but mainly French libertine tradition. The genre effectively ended with the French Revolution. Themes of libertine novels were anti-clericalism, anti-establishment and eroticism.

Authors include 
Cyrano de Bergerac (L’Autre monde ou les états et empires de la Lune, 1657),  
Claude Prosper Jolyot de Crébillon (Les Égarements du cœur et de l'esprit, 1736; Le Sopha, conte moral, 1742), 
Denis Diderot (Les bijoux indiscrets, 1748), 
Marquis de Sade (L'Histoire de Juliette, 1797–1801), 
Choderlos de Laclos (Les Liaisons dangereuses, 1782).

Other famous titles are Histoire de Dom Bougre, Portier des Chartreux (1741) and Thérèse Philosophe (1748).

Precursors to the libertine writers were Théophile de Viau (1590-1626) and Charles de Saint-Evremond (1610-1703), who were inspired by Epicurus and the publication of Petronius, and John Wilmot (Sodom, or the Quintessence of Debauchery, 1684).
.

Robert Darnton is a cultural historian who has covered this genre extensively.

English translations
In alphabetical order by author's last name:

Further reading
In alphabetical order by last name:

References

Literary genres
French literature